Hold Back is a 2012 French drama film directed and written by Rachid Djaidani.

Plot 
In Paris, Dorcy, a young Black Christian and Sabrina, a young North African, want to marry. Their project, however, faces an entrenched taboo in the minds of both communities : no marriage between blacks and Arabs. Slimane, big brother, guardian of traditions, will oppose by all means to this union.

Cast 
 Slimane Dazi as Slimane
 Sabrina Hamida as Sabrina
 Stéphane Soo Mongo as Dorcy
 Nina Morato as Nina
 Max Boublil as Dorcy's friend

Accolades

References

External links 

2012 films
French romantic drama films
2012 romantic drama films
Films about interracial romance
French interfaith romance films
Films about racism
2012 directorial debut films
2010s French-language films
2010s French films